Is He My Girlfriend? (Spanish: ¿Mi novia es él?) is a 2019 Peruvian comedy film directed by Coco Bravo & Edwin Sierra. It stars Colombian actor Gregorio Pernía, Melissa Paredes and Edwin Sierra.

Synopsis 
Tony (Gregorio Pernia), a film producer, arrives at a hotel in Tarapoto. There he meets a famous artist from the area, 'La Fuana' (Edwin Sierra).

Cast 
The actors participating in this film are:

 Gregorio Pernía as Tony
 Melissa Paredes as Lucerito
 Edwin Sierra as Catalina
 Carlos Solano as Bryan
 Camucha Negrete as Sor Rita

Reception 
The film premiered on August 31, 2019. On its first day, the film had 10,439 viewers, and at the end of the week it was in third place among the most viewed films in Peru. But, it was soon withdrawn from several theaters for unclear reasons.

References

External links 

 

2019 films
2019 comedy films
Peruvian comedy films
2010s Peruvian films
2010s Spanish-language films
Films set in Peru
Films shot in Peru
Films about artists